Thècle Mbororo (born 24 September 1989) is a Cameroon football goalkeeper who plays for Cameroonian side Panthère de Garoua.
As of June 2015, she has made five appearances for the Cameroon women's national football team, and was also part of the Cameroon squad at the 2015 FIFA Women's World Cup but did not make an appearance.

References

External links 

1989 births
Living people
Women's association football goalkeepers
Cameroonian women's footballers
Cameroon women's international footballers
2015 FIFA Women's World Cup players
African Games silver medalists for Cameroon
African Games medalists in football
Competitors at the 2015 African Games
20th-century Cameroonian women
21st-century Cameroonian women